There Must Be a Better World Somewhere is the twenty seventh studio album by B. B. King released in 1981. It was awarded the Grammy Award for Best Ethnic or Traditional Recording the following year.

Track listing
All tracks composed by Doc Pomus and Dr. John; except where indicated
"The Victim" – 6:18
"More, More, More" (Hugh McCracken, Jay Hirsh) – 4:39
"You're Going with Me" – 4:35
"Life Ain't Nothing But a Party" – 6:13
"Born Again Human" – 8:30
"There Must Be a Better World Somewhere" – 5:38

Personnel
B.B. King – vocals, guitar
Hugh McCracken – guitar
David "Fathead" Newman – tenor saxophone
Ronald E. Cuber - baritone saxophone
Hank Crawford – alto saxophone
Waymon Reed, Charlie Miller – trumpet
Tom Malone – trombone
Bernard Purdie – drums
Dr. John – keyboards
Wilbur Bascomb – bass guitar
Donny Gerrard, Vennette Gloud, Carmen Twillie – backing vocals on "More, More, More"
Producer: Stewart Levine

References

1981 albums
B.B. King albums
Albums produced by Stewart Levine
MCA Records albums
Grammy Award for Best Ethnic or Traditional Folk Recording